Liddy may refer to:

Surname
 Brian Liddy, former Los Angeles Police Department officer charged, but not convicted in the Rampart scandal 
 Ed Liddy (born 1946), American businessperson, former chairman and CEO of American International Group (2008-2009)
 G. Gordon Liddy (1930–2021), American lawyer and Watergate conspirator
 James Liddy (1934–2008), Irish poet
 Liz Liddy, American information scientist
 Pat Liddy (born 1944), Irish writer
 Seán Liddy (1890–1965), Irish politician, founding member of the Garda Síochána (the police force of the Republic of Ireland)
 Tom Liddy (born 1962), American attorney, politician and radio talk show host, son of G. Gordon Liddy

Given name or nickname
 Liddy Clark (born 1953), Australian former politician and actress
 Liddy Hegewald (1884–1950), German film producer
 Liddy Holloway (1947–2004), New Zealand actress
 Liddy Nevile (born 1947), Australian academic

See also
 Liddie, a list of people with the surname
 Lidy, a list of people with the given name or nickname

Feminine given names
Hypocorisms